Trio da Paz is a Brazilian jazz group formed in 1986 that consists of Romero Lubambo on guitar, Nilson Matta on bass and Duduka Da Fonseca on drums.

Discography
 Brasil from the Inside (Concord Picante, 1992)
 Black Orpheus (Kokopelli, 1994)
 Partido Out (Malandro, 1998)
 Cafe (Malandro, 2002)
 Somewhere (Blue Toucan Music, 2006)
 Harry Allen with Trio Da Paz (Swingbros, 2007)
 Live at JazzBaltica (Maxjazz, 2008)
 Night of My Beloved (Venus, 2008)
 30 (Zoho, 2016)

With Kenny Barron
Canta Brasil (Sunnyside, 2002)

References

Malandro Records artists
Brazilian jazz ensembles
Musical groups established in 1986
1986 establishments in Brazil
Zoho Music artists